Lost Harmony is a 2011 Japanese horror film directed by Toki Yoshimasa and starring Alice Hirose.

Cast
 Alice Hirose as Sanae Miyata
 Ayako Yoshitani as Kaori Kubo
 Mitsuki Takahata as Maki Kamimura
 Tanaka Miharu as Shizuru Kamei
 Erika Yanagita as Nanami Saigō

References

External links
 

2011 horror films
Japanese horror films
2011 films
2010s Japanese films